Luigi Guglielmo Cambray-Digny (8 April 1820 – 11 December 1906) was an Italian politician. He was born in Florence and he was the first mayor of his hometown. He was a recipient of the Order of Saints Maurice and Lazarus.

See also

References

External links
Ulteriori informazioni nella scheda sul database dell'Archivio Storico del Senato, I Senatori d'Italia.

1820 births
1906 deaths
19th-century Italian politicians
Finance ministers of Italy
Mayors of Florence
Recipients of the Order of Saints Maurice and Lazarus
Presidents of the Province of Florence